Särklass may refer to:

Särklass A, sailing class
Särklass C, sailing class